In Mediterranean architecture, the fina is a physical space used in urban design, corresponding to the approximately 1-meter-wide public space alongside buildings. It is used to describe the placement of design items within traditional architectural elements. It also mandates public rules of behaviour for the neighbours concerning the usage and maintenance of finas in their buildings. For instance, a person has the right to use the part of the fina immediately in front of his home for the loading or unloading of his vehicle but he has no right to block it.

Fina is identified as a convention in ancient Levant architecture that denotes a zone along the street wall of a building where balconies, downspouts, and other protruding features were allowed as long as they did not impede the passage of public transport and other users of the street. In Islamic architecture, fina or Al-Fina, which emerged in old Islamic cities that were organized by Islamic law, refers to a patio – an open-sky courtyard of a central building. It serves to illuminate and ventilate rooms and spaces inside buildings. This particular architectural concept is still used in urban spaces in the Middle East such as Egypt as a form of environmental organizer. This in-between space also influences the urban fabric and character of the city.

Fina has two types of uses: temporary and permanent. Trees, flower pots, window gratings and other decorations constitute the temporary uses of fina. Its permanent use are represented by built-in structures such as stairs, benches, and water-related infrastructure, among others. These also include the sabat, which is a structure built between the opposite buildings on both sides of a narrow street. It is constituted by rooms bridging the street. It provides a passageway to respect the right of way, and the supporting pillars of the resulting arch must be within the fina.

References

Further reading
 Arabic-Islamic cities: building and planning principles. BS Hakim - 1986 - Kegan Paul Intl
 Mediterranean urban and building codes: origins, content, impact, and lessons, Urban Design International
 Learning from Traditional Mediterranean Codes by Besim Hakim. The Town Paper -Council report III/IV - April 2003  
  Generative processes for revitalising historic towns or heritage districts by Besim Hakim. INTBAU - International Network for Traditional Building, Architecture & Urbanism.

Urban design